Sankashū (山家集||“Collection of a Mountain Home”) is a collection of poems by Saigyō, most probably made by the poet himself, and issued  c.1180.

Dating
Because the collection contains no poems from the last decade of Saigyō's life, 1180-90, he is thought to have closed it c.1180, and circulated it thereafter.

Divisions
The collection contains 1552 poems, His early translator, Hei-Hachuro Honda, valorised  Saigyō's poems of solitude over those that were involved in more communal activities. Later critics, however, have paid more attention to how his poetry was rooted both in his private life and the public life of his society.

See also

References

Further reading
Ito Yoshio ed., Sanka-shū (Tokyo 1047)
Burton Watson trans., Poems of a Mountain Home (NY 1991)

External links 
 The monk Saigyo
 Classical Japanese Database - has some poems by Saigyō in translations and in the original Japanese

Classic
Late Old Japanese texts
Heian period in literature
12th-century poetry